The Tyrrell 004 is a Formula One racing car which was designed for the 1972 Formula One season by Tyrrell's Chief Designer, Derek Gardner. It is the fourth and final car built of the basic Tyrrell 001 design. The 004 was seen in five races, three with Tyrrell: Jackie Stewart drove the 004 in the Monaco Grand Prix to finish 4th; the Scotsman was also scheduled to drive it in the Belgian Grand Prix, but a stomach ulcer put him out of the race, and the team did not use a replacement driver. Patrick Depailler drove the 004 in the French Grand Prix and was not classified, and the Frenchman was given one more opportunity in the 004 for the United States Grand Prix and finished 7th.

The 004 was replaced by the Tyrrell 005, the first car of Gardner's new design. In 1973, 004 was sold to a South African team. Eddie Keizan was not classified in the 1973 South African Grand Prix and finished 14th in the 1974 South African Grand Prix. Keizan also drove the car in the South African Formula One Championship, recording two wins and nine second-place finishes in 1973 and 1974. The car is now owned by a collector in the United States, where it has been restored, and is driven in historic races.

Complete Formula One World Championship results
(key)(results in bold indicate pole position, results in italics indicate fastest lap)

‡ 3 points were scored using the Tyrrell 004; the other 48 points were scored using the Tyrrell 002, Tyrrell 003 and Tyrrell 005

References

1972 Formula One season cars
1973 Formula One season cars
1974 Formula One season cars
Tyrrell Formula One cars